Hilchen Sommerschild (1756 - 6 November 1831), was a Norwegian teacher. She was a teacher with the title læremoder (Teacher Mother) at the  Trondhjems borgerlige Realskole (The Burgher's Realschule in Trondhjem) between 1799 and 1826. She is referred to as the first academic professional teacher of her sex in Norway.

Hilchen Sommerschild was born to sea captain Job Thode (1720–66) and Inger Marie Gram (1725–82) and married in 1790 to sea captain Peter Henrich Sommerschild (1754–1798). Her education is unknown. In 1799, she was employed as a teacher for the female students at the first Realschule in Norway: Trondhjems borgerlige Realskole. It had been opened in 1783 and was intended to teach both genders, but it had been regarded unsuitable for females to be educated there until the employment of a female teacher.

Her subjects were music, singing and languages: she was also expected to tend to household tasks, and order in school and to always be present to supervise the female students whether in class or on the breaks. She was described as competent. She was given a salary of 150 riksdaler in comparison to her male colleagues, who were given 300. In 1803 she was given a maid as an assistant. The school was seen as a model school for the following public schools which were founded after it, as was her position there until the 1860s.

References

1756 births
1831 deaths
18th-century Norwegian women
18th-century Norwegian educators
19th-century Norwegian women
19th-century Norwegian educators
People from Trondheim